The Pomeranian-Kuyavian Derby, also known as the Pomeranian Derby (Derby Pomorza) is a motorcycle speedway match between rivals Polonia Bydgoszcz and KS Toruń. The rivalry comes about as Bydgoszcz and Toruń are the two largest cities in former Bydgoszcz Voivodeship (1946–1975), and since 1999 two capitals of Kuyavian-Pomeranian Voivodeship. They are often identified with political and sociological local antagonist.

Head to Head 

Last update: September 10, 2016

Riders who ride for both clubs 
There are incomplete list of riders, who ride in Derby for both clubs:

See also 
 Sports rivalry
 Nationalism and sport
 Kuyavian-Pomeranian Voivodeship (Bydgoszcz-Toruń)

References

External links 
 (pl) Polonia Bydgoszcz webside
 (pl) KS Toruń webside
 (pl) www.DerbyPomorza.pl

Derby
Derby
Speedway
Speedway competitions in Poland
Team rivalries in sports